Qaleh-ye Sorkh (also Romanized as Qal‘eh-ye Sorkh and Qal‘eh-e Sorkh) is a village in Garkan-e Shomali Rural District, Pir Bakran District, Falavarjan County, Isfahan Province, Iran. At the 2006 census, its population was 408, in 112 families.

References 

Populated places in Falavarjan County